Thomas Allan Reid (born June 24, 1946) is a retired professional ice hockey player who played 701 regular season games in the National Hockey League.  He played for the Chicago Black Hawks and Minnesota North Stars over an 11-year career.

Reid was born in Fort Erie, Ontario.

Playing career 
Not known as a goal scorer, perhaps Reid's best known accomplishment as a player was scoring a rare penalty shot goal on October 14, 1971 against Ken Dryden of the Montreal Canadiens. It was the only penalty shot ever scored against Dryden and one of only 17 goals that Reid scored in his career. 

Reid was forced to retire as an active player after the 1977–78 season due to a rash known amongst his colleagues as "the gunk" which covered 70 percent of his body. The rash at its worst secretes a yellowish liquid that sticks to a uniform or protective equipment worn by a player. Reid didn’t start experiencing it until his eighth season in the league and was advised by his doctors to end his career because the steroid and cortisone shots he had been taking would lead to fatal consequences. A similar skin disorder would also abbreviate the career of Marián Hossa four decades later.

Broadcasting 
After retiring as a player, Reid spent 12 years as color analyst for the North Stars.  After the team's move to Dallas, Reid continued as an analyst for NCAA hockey. He and Bob Kurtz have been part of the radio broadcast team for the Minnesota Wild since the team's inaugural season in 2000.

Career statistics

References

External links

Tom Reid bio

1946 births
Living people
Canadian ice hockey defencemen
Chicago Blackhawks players
College hockey announcers in the United States
Fort Frances Royals players
Minnesota North Stars announcers
Minnesota North Stars players
Minnesota Wild announcers
National Hockey League broadcasters
Ice hockey people from Ontario
Sportspeople from Fort Erie, Ontario